William Henry Feldon (16 June 1871 – 5 April 1945) was a sculptor, architectural sculptor, and monumental mason from Oxford, England who migrated to New Zealand in 1910. He is best known for his series of First World War memorials—where annual Anzac Day services are held—and his contributions to iconic public buildings in New York, New Zealand, and England.

Early life 
Feldon was born at Oxford, England on 16 June 1871 to Theodore and Anna Lousie Feldon (née Tolley). He was the third son of a family of 12 children. He was baptised at St Clement's Church, Oxford and confirmed at St Cross Church, Oxford in 1885.

Feldon attended school at Exeter College, Oxford from the age of six years, where he won a singing scholarship. Feldon left school to find work as a sculptor artist as he preferred this to singing. He was inspired by the sculpture and carving work in Oxford.

In June 1884, at the age of thirteen, he was apprenticed to H.J. Arnett at Oxford, to learn sculpture and carving. After serving five years with the firm, he moved to London to work for Farmer & Brindley. Overall, he spent 10 years in training.

Personal life 
On 23 September 1894, Feldon married Catherine Martha Tyrrell Walker of Oxford at St Margaret's Church, Barking, Essex. They had two sons and three daughters. The family home on Seaview Road, Remuera, was named 'Cherwell', after the river through Feldon's hometown in Oxfordshire.

In 1914, Feldon was commissioned as a lay reader in the Church of England.

On 29 March 1923, Feldon was commissioned as a Justice of the Peace.

Feldon was a Freemason for most of his life. He was Past Master of Te Awamutu Lodge 2221 E.C. Master of the Union Mark Lodge, P.N. Ark Mariners, Past Second Principal of both Te Awamutu and Southern Cross Chapters and was a Prime Rose Croix, holding Various Grand Lodge Positions.

Throughout his life, Feldon suffered from Keratoconus, which eventually made carving difficult and dangerous.

Military service 
In 1896, Feldon was commissioned as 2nd Lieutenant to 2nd Sussex Artillery, seconded for two years annual training.

In 1914, Feldon was appointed Commandant of the German Internment Camp at Motuihe Island. He was subsequently promoted to Brigade Major of the Auckland Mounted Rifles, becoming Area Officer from Rotorua to Ōpōtiki, with headquarters at Tauranga.

In 1915, Feldon was appointed Brigade Major of the Auckland Infantry, Headquartered in Auckland. He was subsequently appointed District Quartermaster and Quartermaster at the Engineer Tunnelling Camp, Avondale.

In 1916, he was Quartermaster on Transports 44 & 53 to Egypt aboard the Union Steamship Navua. Upon his return from the second convoy, he was transferred to Invercargill as Officer Commanding Area 45, and Adjutant 8th Southland District (Otago) Attesting Officer.

Professional career 
While working for Farmer & Brindley, he worked in New York on a Vanderbilt mansion on Fifth Avenue, then on the New York State Capitol at Albany. On completion of this work, he returned to London in early 1894 to continue work for the firm.

In the late 1890s, Feldon started his own studio in Cornfield Road, Eastbourne, East Essex where he advertised himself as an architectural sculptor and modeller in marble, stone, cement, and wood. His work included the carving on the Lewes Old Bank and the new St. Peter's Church, Eastbourne.

While in Sussex, Feldon was visiting Master to the Colleges at Eastbourne, teaching Carving and Modelling.

Feldon then returned to Oxford, establishing a studio on St. John's Road. During this time he received several commissions at Colleges and churches. He also completed carvings for the restoration of Eton College Chapel and the new Bradfield College Chapel.

In 1910, Feldon was commissioned by the New Zealand Government to carry out the modelling on the new Government House, Wellington. He then moved to Auckland where he carved the interior and exterior of the Auckland Town Hall and the Auckland Ferry Building. In 1911, he carved whole works for St Paul's Church, the Auckland Magistrates Court, Old University Buildings (Choral Hall), and a bust of Richard Seddon for the Seddon Memorial Technical College. The AMP Society commissioned Feldon to complete carvings for the Auckland office, followed by Amicus certus in re incerta sculptures for their Auckland, Christchurch, Palmerston North, Whangarei, Masterton, and Hamilton offices. From his Victoria Street East studio, he carved the majority of modelling for Queen Street commercial buildings.

In 1918, Feldon returned to his Victoria Street studio. In March 1918, Feldon completed a figure study of Nurse Edith Cavell for above the entrance to the new Princess Mary Hospital for Children in Auckland. The Mount Somers stone statue is life size and displayed the nurse in her Red Cross uniform. Statues of a soldier and sailor were added later.

In early 1919, Feldon was commissioned to create works for the new All Souls Roman Catholic Church in Devonport, including label moulds for the window and sanctuary arches, then the main altar from Oamaru stone.

Short of work, Feldon sent a circular offering his services to every county chairman and mayor in the country. In January 1919, he wrote to the Minister of Public Works and Defence, Sir James Allen, pleading for work. In Sir James' opinion, to ‘express high ideals’ and ‘replicate the monuments of older civilisations’, then only foreign artists and those from ‘the mother country’ should be hired as they had the ‘experience and talent to produce them.’ As a result, most communities chose 'catalogue' obelisks and sculptures made in Carrara, Italy factories instead of using New Zealand sculptors and materials.

Feldon moved to a new studio at 130 Great South Road in Remuera, next to the Remuera Railway Station. From his new studio, he carved the Matakana, Papakura-Karaka, Arawa, Helensville-Mairetahi, Mercer, Bombay, Pokeno, Oratia, Hikurangi, and Otahuhu World War I memorials. The Matakana and Arawa memorials were the first statues of George V in the world. Feldon eventually carved more war memorials than all other New Zealand sculptors (such as William Trethewey, Richard Gross, Carlo Bergamini, and Jack Lynch) combined.

In 1928, he was commissioned to carve life sized marble figures of Lord Jellicoe, Lord Kitchener, and Sir Joseph Ward for the Invercargill Post Office quadrangle.

In 1932, Feldon was commissioned to carry out the sculptured heads of bishops and the marble carving on the Nelson Cathedral. He then carved a marble font for St Peter's Cathedral, Hamilton.

In 1934, Feldon completed his final Amicus certus in re incerta for AMP's Napier office. In 1938 he carved a statue commemorating the pioneer women of Howick.

During his prolific career, Feldon displayed the full range of his craft, adapting Romanesque Revival, Neo-Renaissance, Neo-Gothic, Italianate style, Art-Nouveau, Edwardian Baroque, Stripped Classicism, and Art Deco styles for local materials and conditions. His stoic, Stripped Classicism statues were distinctive from the 'determined, unrefined realism' of other New Zealand-based sculptors at the time.

Notable works

Death 
Four years after his wife died, Feldon died in 1945 at the age of 74 years. He is buried beside his wife in Purewa Cemetery, Meadowbank, Auckland.

References 

20th-century New Zealand sculptors
20th-century New Zealand male artists
20th-century British sculptors
19th-century British sculptors
English sculptors
New Zealand sculptors
New Zealand military memorials and cemeteries
Burials at Purewa Cemetery